Dealin' is an album by bassist Richard Davis recorded in 1973 and released on the Muse label.

Reception
Allmusic awarded the album 3 stars.

Track listing 
All compositions by Richard Davis except as indicated
 "What'd You Say" – 6:25   
 "Dealin'" – 6:07   
 "Julie's Rag Doll" – 5:40   
 "Sweet'n" – 3:57   
 "Sorta" – 3:15   
 "Blues for Now" – 11:06

Personnel 
Richard Davis – bass, electric bass, vocals
Marvin Peterson – trumpet, tambourine, cowbell
Clifford Jordan – tenor saxophone, cowbell
David Spinozza – guitar
Paul Griffin – piano, electric piano, clavinet
Freddie Waits – drums

References 

Richard Davis (bassist) albums
1974 albums
Muse Records albums
Albums produced by Don Schlitten